Víctor Manuel Gomis Pastor (born 1 November 1982 in Crevillent, Valencian Community) is a Spanish footballer who plays for Crevillente Deportivo as a left back.

External links

1982 births
Living people
People from Crevillent
Sportspeople from the Province of Alicante
Spanish footballers
Footballers from the Valencian Community
Association football defenders
Segunda División players
Segunda División B players
Tercera División players
Elche CF Ilicitano footballers
Elche CF players
Villajoyosa CF footballers
Rayo Vallecano players
Polideportivo Ejido footballers
Crevillente Deportivo players
Zamora CF footballers
CD Castellón footballers
Huracán Valencia CF players
Orihuela CF players